Vicki Lancaster-Kerr (born 26 January 1951) is an Australian former professional tennis player.

Lancaster-Kerr was an Australian Open junior doubles champion (with Lesley Hunt in 1968) and competed on the professional tour during the 1970s. Her two appearances in the women's singles second round at the Australian Open included a three set loss to eventual semi-finalist Sue Barker in 1975. She played collegiate tennis for Midland College in the Texas city of Midland, where she still resides.

References

External links
 
 

1951 births
Living people
Australian female tennis players
Midland College alumni
Australian emigrants to the United States